Pokémon Café ReMix (originally named Pokémon Café Mix) is a free-to-play puzzle video game developed by Genius Sonority and published by Nintendo and The Pokémon Company for the Nintendo Switch, Android and iOS. The game was released on June 23, 2020, in North America, and on June 24, 2020, in Japan, Europe and Australia.

Originally named Pokémon Cafe Mix, the game was renamed to Pokémon Cafe ReMix on October 28, 2021.

Gameplay
The gameplay of Pokémon Café Mix is similar to the Disney Tsum Tsum and Yo-kai Watch: Wibble Wobble mobile games, which are games where a player connects icons together to advance missions. In the game, the player and Eevee are the owners of a café where Pokémon come and order Pokémon-related foods and drinks. With each order, the player engages in a puzzle to make the items. In these puzzles, the player needs to clear Pokémon icons on screen by linking them in a string. The goal is to collect enough of a particular item as displayed on the customer's list. Some puzzles may involve clearing extra key objects, like Cafe skills and megaphones. The player is able to level up Pokémon to develop menu items to attract more Pokémon. Staff Pokémon can help with puzzles by making them easier, for example by changing one type of icon into another. Some Pokémon can only be available in points events and team events, delivery feature and legendary visit events, which feature the one-minute cooking mode

For the Nintendo Switch release, the game only supports handheld mode.

Like similar free-to-play puzzle games, Pokémon Café Mix used a "life" system where a player failing a level would lose a life, and running out of lives resulted in a time delay before they could play again. Extra lives can be purchased with "golden acorns" which are earned through play, received from friends, or purchased with microtransactions. When the game relaunched as Remix, this system was changed and each attempt at a level consumed a life, whether successful or not. Periods of 15, 30, or 45 minutes of unlimited play can be earned in game or purchased.

Development

The game was announced during the Pokémon Presents presentation on June 17, 2020. On August 18, 2021, it was announced in another Pokémon Presents that it was revamped to Pokémon Café ReMix.

Reception

Pokémon Café Mix received "mixed or average reviews" according to the review aggregator Metacritic. It was praised by critics for its art style, deemed "adorably nostalgic" by TheGamer's Abby Espiritu, and also praised by Nintendo Life's Chris Scullion for its "easy to learn" matching mechanic. The game was mainly criticized because it was only playable with touchscreen, making Switch play uncomfortable. It was also criticized by Nathan Ellingsworth of SwitchPlayer for "an eventual sluggish pace", and gave the game a score of 3/5. It was nominated for Best Mobile Game for The Game Awards 2020.

References

External links

Pokémon Café ReMix website for North America

2020 video games
Android (operating system) games
Free-to-play video games
Genius Sonority games
IOS games
Café Mix
Puzzle video games
Nintendo Switch games
Video games developed in Japan
Video games scored by Tsukasa Tawada